Marcelo Ribeiro, usually known as Bujica (born January 21, 1969) is a retired professional Brazilian footballer who played as a striker for several Série A clubs.

Career
Born in Cachoeiro de Itapemirim, Espírito Santo state, Bujica started his career playing for the youth team of Flamengo, of Rio de Janeiro in 1983, when he was fourteen years-old, playing his first professional match in 1989. During a Campeonato Brasileiro Série A game on November 5 of that year, he scored two goals for Flamengo against rival Vasco during Bebeto's first match against Flamengo as a Vasco player, receiving the nickname Maharaja Hunter, Maharaja was the nickname given by Flamengo's supporters to Bebeto because he accepted a very expensive transfer to Vasco. He scored  a goal on December 2, 1989 during Zico's farewell match, when Flamengo beat Fluminense 5–0 for the Campeonato Brasileiro Série A. Bujica won the Copa do Brasil in 1990, but was transferred to Botafogo for the 1991 season, after scoring three goals in 16 Campeonato Brasileiro Série A matches for Flamengo. During his two years playing for Botafogo, he scored five goals in 17 Campeonato Brasileiro Série A matches, and helped his club finish as the 1992 Campeonato Brasileiro Série A runner-up, losing the final to his former club, Flamengo.

He played a Campeonato Brasileiro Série A match for Ceará in 1993 and ten matches for Fortaleza, scoring three goals. In 1995, he was the Campeonato Matogrossense's top goalscorer, with 23 goals, while playing for that year's champion, Operário-VG. In the same year, Bujica played nine Campeonato Brasileiro Série A matches for Bahia, scoring one goal. He played for Alianza Lima, of Peru in 1997, winning that year's Primera División Peruana, returning to Brazil in 1998, playing for Sinop, he won the Campeonato Matogrossense again. He won the Campeonato Capixaba in 2002 while playing for Alegrense. Bujica played for Cachoeiro in 2004, retiring in the same year as an Estrela do Norte footballer.

Retirement
After his retirement, Bujica opened a football academy in Rio Branco, Acre state, named Escolinha Bujica de Futebol, aiming children from six to fourteen years-old. He also started studying Physical education. In 2007, Bujica worked as Independência's caretaker manager, then in 2008 he was hired as the club's assistant manager.

Honors
Bujica won the following honors during his career:

See also
Football in Brazil
List of football clubs in Brazil

References

1969 births
Living people
Brazilian footballers
Brazilian expatriate footballers
Brazilian football managers
CR Flamengo footballers
Botafogo de Futebol e Regatas players
America Football Club (RJ) players
Ceará Sporting Club players
Fortaleza Esporte Clube players
Associação Atlética Internacional (Limeira) players
Esporte Clube Bahia players
Club Alianza Lima footballers
Sinop Futebol Clube players
Expatriate footballers in Ecuador
Expatriate footballers in Peru
Expatriate footballers in Greece
Expatriate footballers in Portugal
Association football forwards
CE Operário Várzea-Grandense players
Estrela do Norte Futebol Clube players
Sportspeople from Espírito Santo